The 1907 international cricket season was from April 1907 to September 1907.

Season overview

July

South Africa in England

September

MCC in North America

References

International cricket competitions by season
1907 in cricket